Khowai is a town located in the Indian state of Tripura and a Municipal Council in Khowai district. The city lies on the banks of Khowai river and hence from the river the city gets its name. It was originally settled upon by Upendranath Roy. Located near the Bangladesh border, Khowai has boundaries with Bangladesh on its entire southern part.

Demographics

As of the 2001 India census, Khowai had a population of 17,621. Males constituted 51% of the population and females 49%. Khowai has an average literacy rate of 86%, higher than the national average of 59.5%: male literacy is 88%, and female literacy is 85%. In Khowai, 9% of the population is under 6 years of age.

Forest
There are two range sector offices in the subdivision of Khowai – Khowai and Padmabil. The Khowai range has 13,578 hectares of forest land whereas the Padmabil range has 6,468 hectares of forest land.

Health
Khowai has one district hospital (Khowai Hospital), five Public Health centers, and 43 health sub-centers.

Geography and Climate
Khowai is situated in a plain along the Khowai River and has a monsoon influenced humid subtropical climate with large amounts of rain almost all year. The city experiences long, hot and wet summers, lasting from April to October. Average temperatures are around 28 °C (82 °F), fluctuating with rainfall. There is a short, mild winter from mid-November to early March, with mostly dry conditions and average temperatures around 18 °C (64 °F).

Culture
There is predominance of both the Kokborok and Bangla languages in Khowai. The main festivals of the town are Durga Puja, Kharchi, Garia Pooja, and Tring (Tripuri new year).

Indo-Bangladesh Border
The length of the border along Khowai is 61.5 km. It is almost fully fenced (only 950 metres are pending).

Khowai District
The sub-division has already become a district named "Khowai". All the district regulatory offices will start functioning in the district town Khowai. Two sub-divisions, Khowai and Teliamura, make up the new district, with a total area of 1378.28 km2. Saradamayee Vidyapith is one of the best English medium schools in Teliamura subdivision of Khowai district.

Transport
Khowai Airport which serves Khowai, is currently non-operational.

Education
Dasaratha Deb Memorial College
 Jawahar Novadaya Vidyalaya
Khowai Government Higher Secondary School
Khowai Government Girls' Class XII School      
Khowai Government English Medium Class XII School
Sharat Chandra Class XII School
Sonatala Govt. Class XII School
Ananda Marga School
Don Bosco School, Baijal bari

See also
 List of cities and towns in Tripura

References

External links
Official site of Khowai

Cities and towns in Khowai district
Khowai district